Human Giant is a sketch comedy show, starring writer/performers Aziz Ansari, Rob Huebel, and Paul Scheer, and directed primarily by Jason Woliner. The show ran for two seasons on MTV. In interviews, the group has mentioned that they were offered a third season by MTV but were unable to complete it due to Ansari's commitments to the hit NBC show Parks and Recreation, while Ansari mentioned on Howard Stern that the show's end was more because it is hard to keep a sketch show consistently funny over several seasons. The group has stated that MTV has left the door open for the group to complete a third season at a later date or to produce a special for the network. In 2010, Ansari, Huebel and Scheer reunited to do a skit for the 2010 MTV Movie Awards.

In November 2008, The Hollywood Reporter noted the group was developing a feature film with Red Hour Productions, the production company run by Ben Stiller and producer Stuart Cornfeld.

Premise
The show, which premiered on April 5, 2007, consists of short humorous videos. Some of the clips were first seen online such as "Shutterbugs", as part of Channel 101 NY, "Clell Tickle: Indie Marketing Guru", "The Illusionators" and an unaired skit called "Other Music". Human Giant has also gained a large audience in the New York City comedy scene through live shows at the Upright Citizens Brigade and their weekly comedy show, Crash Test.

The show closed out a Thursday night "10 Spot" line-up for MTV, which also included Pimp My Ride, Short Circuitz (before being put on hiatus), and Adventures in Hollyhood, ending with Human Giant. The line-up started at 9 PM and ended at 11 PM.

Episodes

Season 1

 This skit was removed from the season one DVD.
 These skits were edited for the season one DVD.
 Added for the season one DVD.

Season 2
The group began working on Human Giant Season 2 at the end of August, 2007.  Season 2 premiered on March 11, 2008 and ran for 6 episodes. The season finale premiered April 15, 2008.
Note the CrimeTime sketch, the Gay Porn Star Car Accident sketch, and the Illusinator Camera Trick sketch for season 2 all show up on the Season 1 DVD as easter eggs.

24-hour marathon
The cast of Human Giant were on-air on MTV and MTV2 for a twenty-four-hour period between noon on Friday, May 18, 2007 to noon on Saturday, May 19, 2007, broadcasting from MTV's Times Square studio, during which time they were given free rein to perform skits, bring in guests, and air clips from classic MTV series like “Remote Control” and “The State”. The ostensible premise of the "marathon" was that their show would be given a second season if they could get a million hits on their website (which it did) during that time. Notable guests stopping by included Albert Hammond Jr., Fred Armisen, Bill Hader, Andy Samberg, and Jorma Taccone from Saturday Night Live, Will Arnett and Michael Cera from Arrested Development, John Krasinski, Bob Odenkirk, Michael Showalter, Kristen Schaal, Eugene Mirman, Ted Leo, Corn Mo, Todd Barry, Matt Higgins, Zach Galifianakis, Morningwood, Mastodon, Tapes 'n Tapes, The National, Tim and Eric, Tegan and Sara, and others.

Reunion
In late May 2010, troupe member Aziz Ansari announced on his website that he and fellow members Rob Huebel, Paul Scheer and Jason Woliner had filmed a brand new sketch for the 2010 MTV Movie Awards, which Ansari was scheduled to host. Ansari mentioned that it would be a Human Giant reunion of sorts, the first time they filmed a new sketch together as a sketch group since the series ended.

The sketch was called "Stunt Kidz", which consisted of Huebel and Ansari's Shutterbugs characters, now owners of a child stunt agency where little children act as stunt men for dangerous scenes and end up injured in several occasions. Scheer acts as a director who employs Huebel and Ansari.

Home releases
The first season of Human Giant was released on March 4, 2008, one week ahead of the season two premiere on March 11. It was released in a two-disc set. Disc one features all eight episodes and commentary tracks on all episodes with special guests calling-in or with the cast in the commentary room. Disc two features highlights from the 24-hour marathon, deleted and alternate scenes, unaired sketches, sneak previews for season two, early footage with Aziz, Rob and Paul, and a compilation clip.

Credited consultants
The core writing team consists of Aziz Ansari, Rob Huebel, Paul Scheer, Jason Woliner and executive producer Tom Gianas. The following people have, at one point, also worked as consultants on the show:

 Eric Appel
 Andy Blitz
 Brian Posehn
 Patton Oswalt
 Jon Glaser
 Dan Mintz
 Howard Kremer
 Jay Johnston
 Ian Roberts
 Matt Walsh
 Leo Allen
 Jerry Minor
 Ali Farahnakian
 Morgan Murphy
 H. Jon Benjamin
 Nick Swardson
 Tommy Blacha
 Chris Romano
 Harris Wittels
 Paul Rust
 Neil Campbell
 Bobby Moynihan
 Charlie Sanders
 Kristen Schaal
 Brett Gelman
 John Gemberling
 Curtis Gwinn
 Liz Cackowski

See also
List of programs broadcast by MTV

References

External links

 
 On the Sets of The Human Giant - Images from Venice Beach
 
 Audio interview with Human Giant on public radio program The Sound of Young America
 SuperDeluxe.com - Human Giant Interview (Video)
 New York Magazine - Human Giant Profile
 Pitchforkmedia - Human Giant Interview
 Onion AV Club - Human Giant Interview
 NYTimes - "No One Says '9/11.' No One Needs To."
 Onion AV Club - Human Giant 24 Hour Marathon Coverage
 Village Voice - Human Giant 24 Hour Marathon Coverage
 Human Giant Named One of Varietys "10 Comics to Watch" in 2006

2007 American television series debuts
2008 American television series endings
2000s American sketch comedy television series
American comedy troupes
Channel 101
MTV original programming
Television series based on Internet-based works
Television series by 3 Arts Entertainment